S. H. Barnicoat Monuments, S. H. Barnicoat Granite Works, or, more recently, Hancock Monument Co. was a granite workshop at 114 Columbia Street, at the corner of Centre Street, in Quincy, Massachusetts. It was housed in a rare surviving 19th-century granite workshop building dating to the 1890s, and was, at the time of its listing on the National Register of Historic Places in 1989, one of the only 19th-century granite workshops operating in the city.

The workshop has since been demolished and replaced by a Valvoline lubrication garage and Dunkin Donuts.

See also
National Register of Historic Places listings in Quincy, Massachusetts

References

Industrial buildings and structures on the National Register of Historic Places in Massachusetts
Commercial buildings completed in 1890
Buildings and structures in Quincy, Massachusetts
National Register of Historic Places in Quincy, Massachusetts